Constitutional Convention elections were held in the Marshall Islands on 21 February 2017.

Background
A constitutional convention is used in the Marshall Islands to consider proposed constitutional amendments that have been endorsed by the Legislature. The convention cannot propose new amendments and can only debate those approved by the parliament. Previous conventions had been held in 1977–78, 1989 and 1995.

The proposed changes for the 2017 Constitutional Convention included:
Direct election of the President.
Creating the position of Vice-President.
Stopping the Legislature removing the President, Vice-President and Cabinet from office by motion of no confidence.
Requiring presidential candidates to be a natural-born citizen.
Reserving six seats in the Legislature for women.
Requiring automatic rejection of appropriation bills that do not provide a balanced budget.
Protection from sexual discrimination being enshrined in the Bill of Rights.
Creation of an ombudsman's office.
Empowering the Attorney General to ask an independent body to investigate possible cases of fraud, corruption or unethical behaviour by elected officials and other high-ranking officials.
Increasing the number of members of the Council of Iroij by one.

Electoral system
The 45 members of the Constitutional Convention consisted of 33 directly-elected delegates elected from the 33 Legislature districts, and 12 Iroijs (chiefs). Postal voting was not allowed.

Campaign
A total of 119 candidates contested the 33 directly-elected seats, whilst 24 ran for the 12 seats reserved for the Iroijs. All but seven of the thirty-three members of the Legislature ran for election to the convention.

Results

Aftermath

The Constitutional Convention opened in April 2017. Kessai Note was elected as the body's President, defeating Christopher Loeak by a vote of 22–21.

References

Elections in the Marshall Islands
Marshall
2017 in the Marshall Islands
Election and referendum articles with incomplete results